Liu Yungeng (born July 1947) is a Chinese politician, former Chairman of Shanghai People's Congress. Born in Zhoushan, Zhejiang province, Liu studied at the department of politics of East China Normal University from 1983 to 1985. He served as the police chief of Shanghai in the 1990s, before being promoted to head the Political and Legal Affairs Commission of Shanghai in 2000 and being made Deputy Party Secretary. He was further elevated to Chairman of the Shanghai People's Congress in 2008 upon reaching the age of 60. He served for one term before retiring from politics.

References

1947 births
Living people
Chinese Communist Party politicians from Zhejiang
People's Republic of China politicians from Zhejiang
East China Normal University alumni
Political office-holders in Shanghai
Chinese police officers
Politicians from Zhoushan